Jean-Marc Puissesseau is president and chairman of the ports of Calais and Boulogne (Société d’Exploitation des Ports du Détroit).

References 

French chief executives
Living people
Year of birth missing (living people)